Kakihara Tameike Dam is an earthfill dam located in Shimane Prefecture in Japan. The dam is used for irrigation. The catchment area of the dam is 1 km2. The dam impounds about 18  ha of land when full and can store 1290 thousand cubic meters of water. The construction of the dam was completed in 2009.

References

Dams in Shimane Prefecture
2009 establishments in Japan